Ischnotoma eburnea is a species of cranefly, found in Australia.

References

Tipulidae
Insects of Australia
Insects described in 1848